AFL Victoria (formerly Football Victoria is the state-level sport governing body for Australian rules football in the state of Victoria, Australia. Under the organisation's jurisdiction fall 115 leagues — including the Victorian Football League, the Victorian Amateur Football Association, the Victorian Country Football League and all local metropolitan and country leagues — and 1,942 clubs, (not including the state's ten Australian Football League) clubs, as well as developmental, coaching, and umpiring bodies.

Football Victoria was formed in 1999, to replace the Victorian State Football League, which was formed in 1992 to fill the gap left since 1990 when the previous state governing body (the Victorian Football League) expanded its scope nationally and become the Australian Football League. AFL Victoria also took over the direct operation of the Victorian Metropolitan Football League, bringing its members over to the direct control of AFL Victoria. In February 2007 Football Victoria officially changed its name to AFL Victoria as said in a statement: 
"Adopting the name of AFL Victoria will reinforce the organisations own position and also boost the position of the AFL brand as AFL Victoria works and the AFL work together to expand the reach of football in the face of increasing competition." AFL Victoria News Item

See also

List of Australian rules football leagues in Australia
Australian rules football in Victoria, Australia

External links
 

Australian rules football governing bodies
Australian rules football in Victoria (Australia)
Sports governing bodies in Victoria (Australia)
Sports organizations established in 1999
1999 establishments in Australia
Organisations based in Melbourne